Henry Cooper VC (1825 – 15 July 1893) was an English recipient of the Victoria Cross, the highest and most prestigious award for gallantry in the face of the enemy that can be awarded to British and Commonwealth forces.

He was about 30 years old, and a Boatswain in the Royal Navy during the Crimean War when the following deed took place for which he was awarded the VC.

Action
On 3 June 1855 at Taganrog, Sea of Azov, Crimea, Boatswain Cooper of HMS Miranda together with a lieutenant (Cecil William Buckley) landed while the town was actually under bombardment by the Allied Squadron. It was garrisoned by 3,000 Russian troops, but the two men landed at several places and set fire to government buildings and destroyed enemy equipment and arms. They were under fire themselves for most of the time.

His VC is on display in the Lord Ashcroft Gallery at the Imperial War Museum, London.

References

External links
Location of grave and VC medal (Cornwall)

1825 births
1893 deaths
Military personnel from Plymouth, Devon
Burials in Cornwall
Royal Navy sailors
Royal Navy personnel of the Crimean War
British recipients of the Victoria Cross
Crimean War recipients of the Victoria Cross
Royal Navy recipients of the Victoria Cross